Ďurčiná is a village and municipality in Žilina District in the Žilina Region of northern Slovakia.

History
In historical records the village was first mentioned in 1393.

Geography
It has a population of about 1072 people.

Genealogical resources

The records for genealogical research are available at the state archive "Statny Archiv in Bytca, Slovakia"

 Roman Catholic church records (births/marriages/deaths): 1674-1896 (parish B)

See also
 List of municipalities and towns in Slovakia

External links
http://www.statistics.sk/mosmis/eng/run.html
Surnames of living people in Durcina

Villages and municipalities in Žilina District